The 1996 New York City Marathon was the 27th running of the annual marathon race in New York City, United States, which took place on Sunday, November 3. The men's elite race was won by Italy's Giacomo Leone in a time of 2:09:54 hours while the women's race was won by Romania's Anuța Cătună in 2:28:18.

A total of 28,182 runners finished the race, 20,749 men and 7433 women.

Results

Men

Women

References

Results
1996 New York City Marathon finishers. New York Road Runners. Retrieved 2020-05-23.
Results. Association of Road Racing Statisticians. Retrieved 2020-05-23.

External links
New York Road Runners website

1996
New York City
Marathon
New York City Marathon